Taghjijt is a town in Guelmim Province, Guelmim-Oued Noun, Morocco. According to the 2004 census it has a population of 6,983.

See also
Ifrane Atlas-Saghir

References

Populated places in Guelmim Province
Rural communes of Guelmim-Oued Noun